Thomas Bellchambers (born 9 July 1989) is a former professional Australian rules footballer who played for the Essendon Football Club in the Australian Football League (AFL). After playing for the Tasmanian Devils in the TAC Cup, he was drafted with pick 8 in the 2007 pre-season draft. He made his debut against Hawthorn in Round 11 of the 2008 AFL season. He announced his retirement from the AFL on the 15th of September 2020.

Bellchambers, along with 33 other Essendon players, was found guilty of using a banned performance-enhancing substance, thymosin beta-4, as part of Essendon's sports supplements program during the 2012 season. He and his team-mates were initially found not guilty in March 2015 by the AFL Anti-Doping Tribunal, but a guilty verdict was returned in January 2016 after an appeal by the World Anti-Doping Agency. He was suspended for two years which, with backdating, ended in November 2016; as a result, he served approximately fourteen months of his suspension and missed the entire 2016 AFL season.

He announced his retirement on 15 September 2020, after 136 games.

Statistics
  Statistics are correct to the end of 2019 season

|- style="background-color: #EAEAEA"
! scope="row" style="text-align:center" | 2008
|  || 44 || 3 || 0 || 0 || 7 || 17 || 24 || 8 || 6 || 0.0 || 0.0 || 2.3 || 5.7 || 8.0 || 2.7 || 2.0
|-
! scope="row" style="text-align:center" | 2009
|  || 44 || 6 || 1 || 2 || 11 || 25 || 36 || 15 || 8 || 0.2 || 0.3 || 1.8 || 4.2 || 6.0 || 2.5 || 1.3
|- style="background-color: #EAEAEA" 
! scope="row" style="text-align:center" | 2010
|  || 44 || 5 || 1 || 2 || 21 || 24 || 45 || 23 || 8 || 0.2 || 0.4 || 4.2 || 4.8 || 9.0 || 4.6 || 1.6
|- 
! scope="row" style="text-align:center" | 2011
|  || 44 || 13 || 8 || 2 || 68 || 72 || 140 || 44 || 18 || 0.6 || 0.2 || 5.2 || 5.5 || 10.8 || 3.4 || 1.4
|- style="background-color: #EAEAEA" 
! scope="row" style="text-align:center" | 2012
|  || 44 || 16 || 10 || 10 || 113 || 73 || 186 || 77 || 21 || 0.6 || 0.6 || 7.1 || 4.6 || 11.6 || 4.8 || 1.3
|- 
! scope="row" style="text-align:center" | 2013
|  || 2 || 18 || 28 || 11 || 113 || 72 || 185 || 72 || 23 || 1.6 || 0.6 || 6.3 || 4.0 || 10.3 || 4.0 || 1.3
|- style="background-color: #EAEAEA" 
! scope="row" style="text-align:center" | 2014
|  || 2 || 8 || 3 || 5 || 41 || 33 || 74 || 29 || 14 || 0.4 || 0.6 || 5.1 || 4.1 || 9.2 || 3.6 || 1.8
|- 
! scope="row" style="text-align:center" | 2015
|  || 2 || 10 || 2 || 2 || 52 || 46 || 98 || 36 || 15 || 0.2 || 0.2 || 5.2 || 4.6 || 9.8 || 3.6 || 1.5
|- style="background-color: #EAEAEA" 
! scope="row" style="text-align:center" | 2017
|  || 2 || 14 || 9 || 4 || 86 || 65 || 151 || 55 || 38 || 0.6 || 0.3 || 6.2 || 4.6 || 10.8 || 3.9 || 2.7
|- 
! scope="row" style="text-align:center" | 2018
|  || 2 || 20 || 8 || 8 || 138 || 91 || 229 || 74 || 29 || 0.4 || 0.4 || 6.9 || 4.6 || 11.5 || 3.7 || 1.5
|- style="background-color: #EAEAEA"
! scope="row" style="text-align:center" | 2019
|  || 2 || 16 || 6 || 4 || 105 || 75 || 180 || 52 || 30 || 0.4 || 0.3 || 6.6 || 4.7 || 11.3 || 3.3 || 1.9
|- class="sortbottom"
! colspan=3| Career
! 146
! 76
! 50
! 755
! 593
! 1348
! 485
! 210
! 0.6
! 0.4
! 5.9
! 4.6
! 10.5
! 3.8
! 1.6
|}

References

External links

 

1989 births
Living people
Australian rules footballers from Launceston, Tasmania
Bendigo Football Club players
Doping cases in Australian rules football
Essendon Football Club players
Launceston Football Club players
Tassie Mariners players